James V. Maloney  (born 16 July 1964) is a Canadian lawyer and politician, who was elected to the House of Commons of Canada in the 2015 election. He represents the electoral district of Etobicoke—Lakeshore as a member of the Liberal Party caucus.

Education and early career

Maloney has law degrees from the University of Windsor and University of Wales, as well as a B.A. from Bishop's University.

Prior to his election, Maloney worked as a litigation lawyer with Hughes Amys LLP having been called to the Ontario Bar in 1996.

Municipal Politics

Maloney was appointed to Toronto City Council in 2014 to represent Ward 5 (Etobicoke—Lakeshore) as interim councillor following the resignation of Peter Milczyn from the council.

Federal Politics

Prior to become the Liberal Party candidate in Etobicoke—Lakeshore. Maloney served as president of the electoral district association.

Maloney was elected Member of Parliament for Etobicoke—Lakeshore in the 2015 election as part of the Liberal Party  near-sweep of the Greater Toronto Area. He was appointed to the Standing Joint Committee for the Scrutiny of Regulations.

Since February 2016 Maloney has served as Chair of the Standing Committee on Natural Resources and a member of the Liaison Committee. Following the 2019 general election he was appointed as a member of the standing committee on Justice and Human Rights.

Maloney has served as Chair of the Toronto Government Caucus since 2016.  He is also the Chair of the Canada/Ireland Parliamentary Group and vice-chair of the Canada-Europe Parliamentary Association.  He is a member of the Canada/United Kingdom Parliamentary Association and of the Canadian NATO Parliamentary Association.

In October 2016 community groups in south Etobicoke criticized Maloney for encouraging Metrolinx to drop an appeal of a rezoning decision made by city council. Residents claimed he was favouring the interests of his political allies Mark Grimes and Justin Di Ciano over the interests of local residents.

Maloney was re-elected in the 2019 Canadian federal election.

In January 2020 Maloney introduced a Private member's motion proposing to declare March as Irish Heritage Month.  The motion was adopted by the House of Commons on 10 March 2021.

On 19 November 2020, the Conflict of Interest and Ethics Commissioner Mario Dion released an investigative report that ruled Maloney violated the Conflict of Interest Code for Members of the House of Commons for missing the deadline to disclose his private interests and those of his family members. Dion recommended the House of Commons "require Mr. Maloney to apologize to it for having failed to fulfil his obligations as a Member" The matter was debated in the House of Commons on Friday 19 February 2021 and in a vote by all Members of Parliament the House of Commons declined to accept the report from Commissioner Dion. MP Scott Reid, a Conservative from Ontario, wrote about his vote against the report of the Commissioner saying "The content and structure of the Maloney Report gives some indication that the Commissioner may be acting out of vindictiveness."

Maloney made an apology in the House of Commons on 11 December 2020 and blamed the COVID-19 Pandemic and miscommunication with the Ethics Commissioner for submitting the required information after the deadline. He further state "I stood in the House and apologized, because that is what I was required to do".

Maloney was re-elected in the 2021 Canadian federal election.

Personal life
Maloney has lived in Etobicoke most of his life and attended Michael Power High School.  He lives in south Etobicoke with his partner and their dog.  His father, William Maloney, was appointed to the Supreme Court of Ontario in July 1975 and his mother Marian Maloney was appointed by Prime Minister Chretien to serve in the Canadian Senate in 1999.

Electoral record

References

External links

Toronto city councillors
Living people
Lawyers in Ontario
Liberal Party of Canada MPs
People from Etobicoke
University of Windsor alumni
Bishop's University alumni
Alumni of the University of Wales
Politicians from Thunder Bay
Members of the House of Commons of Canada from Ontario
University of Windsor Faculty of Law alumni
21st-century Canadian politicians
1964 births